The Swan Princess is a 1994 American animated fantasy film based on the ballet Swan Lake. Featuring Michelle Nicastro, Howard McGillin, Jack Palance, John Cleese, Steven Wright, Sandy Duncan, and Steve Vinovich, the film is directed by former Disney animation director Richard Rich and scored by Lex de Azevedo. The film was distributed by New Line Cinema in the United States and by Columbia TriStar Film Distributors International outside the US. It was released theatrically on November 18, 1994, and grossed $9.8 million against a $21 million budget, becoming a box-office bomb, partly due to struggling competition with a re-release of The Lion King (1994). The film later became popular through home video releases and has since been followed by a series of direct-to-video sequels starting in 1997.

The theme song "Far Longer than Forever" is performed by Regina Belle and Jeffrey Osborne. The song was nominated for a Golden Globe in 1995 for Best Original Song.

Plot 
King William and his friend Queen Uberta both have a child; Uberta has a son named Derek and William has a daughter named Odette. At the celebration of Odette's birth, the two make a plan to have them meet and spend every summer together in hopes that they fall in love and marry so that they can unite their two kingdoms forever. Meanwhile, the sorcerer Rothbart plans to take King William's kingdom for himself by mastering a type of dark magic known as The Forbidden Arts. However, William discovers his plans and Rothbart is arrested. Despite calls for his death, King William spares Rothbart's life and banishes him forever. Before leaving, Rothbart swears revenge on King William, that he'll get his powers back and claim everything William has as his own.

William and Uberta put their plan into action. Unfortunately, this fails as Derek and Odette hate each other as children and later as teenagers, but when they reach adulthood, they do fall in love. However, Derek can't think of anything besides Odette's beauty that he loves her for, causing her to reject him, and she and her father leave disappointed. On their journey home, they are ambushed by Rothbart, who got his powers back and transforms into a "Great Animal", kidnapping Odette and fatally injuring William. Derek arrives on the scene and the dying William tells him about the Great Animal ("It's not what it seems"), and that Odette is gone. After searching and finding no sign of Odette, the entire kingdom assumes that she is dead. Uberta tries to encourage her son to find another princess, but Derek is determined to find Odette, believing that she is still alive somewhere.

Derek and his best friend Bromley practice hunting every day in preparation to face the Great Animal, with help from Uberta's valet, Lord Rogers. Elsewhere, Rothbart is keeping Odette captive at the mysterious Swan Lake. After she refuses to marry him, he has cast a powerful spell that turns Odette into a swan during the day, while she can temporarily return to her true form at night if she stands on the lake when the moonlight touches it. During her captivity, she befriends a turtle named Speed, a French frog named Jean-Bob, who claims to be a prince, and an Irish puffin named Lieutenant Puffin.

Puffin and Odette (in her swan form) fly together to find Derek. By chance, they stumble upon Derek in the woods as he is searching for the Great Animal. Derek mistakes Odette for the Great Animal (having deduced that the creature is a shapeshifter) and tries to kill her. The ensuing chase leads Derek to Swan Lake, where he witnesses Odette reverting to a human when the moon rises. The two share a loving reunion, and Odette tells Derek that to break the spell, he must make a vow of everlasting love and "prove it to the world". Derek invites Odette to the ball at the castle the following night, hoping to declare to the world of his love for her. After Derek leaves however, Rothbart arrives, having heard the whole conversation, and tells Odette that she will never make it to the ball, for there will be "no moon" on that night. To make matters worse, Rothbart transforms his cheerful hag sidekick, Bridget, into a doppelgänger Odette, so as to fool Derek to make his vow to the wrong woman, which will kill the real Odette. On the night of the ball, Rothbart imprisons Odette (in swan form) in the dungeon of his castle, along with Bromley, whom he had found in the woods the other night, while the disguised Bridget arrives at the ball and dances with Derek, who is unaware of her true identity.

Meanwhile, Puffin, Speed, and Jean-Bob manage to free Odette from the dungeon through a duel with two hungry alligators and she flies to the castle to warn Derek, but is too late; Derek has made the vow to the wrong woman. Just then, Rothbart bursts in, gloatingly revealing to Derek the fake Odette's true form. Realizing his mistake, Derek follows Odette back to Swan Lake, where she finally transforms back into her human form one last time. As he holds Odette in his arms, she tells Derek that she loves him before finally dying. A heartbroken and enraged Derek confronts Rothbart, demanding that he undo the spell and to not let Odette die, which Rothbart promises to do so, but only if Derek defeats him. Rothbart transforms and reveals himself as the Great Animal, and a battle ensues in which he overpowers Derek. However, Odette's animal friends retrieve Derek's bow, and Bromley, who has also escaped the dungeon, provides Derek with a single arrow, which Derek shoots into Rothbart's heart, instantly killing him.

Afterwards, Derek tearfully confesses his love to Odette, realizing that it's the person Odette has become that he loves about her, and she comes back to life; the spell on her is broken by Derek's love. Derek and Odette get married and they, along with Rogers, Bromley, Uberta, King William's servants, and the animals move into Rothbart's former castle. Meanwhile, Bridget redeems herself and falls in love with Uberta's lackey, Sir Chamberlain, Puffin becomes the general of an army of swans, Odette kisses Jean-Bob who goes into convulsions but does not turn into a prince, and Odette and Derek live happily ever after.

Voice cast

Production 
Having previously directed The Fox and the Hound (1981) and The Black Cauldron (1985) at Walt Disney Feature Animation in Burbank, California, Richard Rich was slated to co-direct Oliver & Company (1988) until he was fired by Disney feature animation president Peter Schneider. Following his departure from Disney, he subsequently formed his own studio, Rich Animation Studios with about 26 employees, in which most of his key employees came from Disney, including the company's marketing chief, Matt Mazer. Subsequently, Jared F. Brown from Living Scriptures, Inc. tapped Rich into producing half-hour animated videos based on the audio cassettes readings of the Book of Mormon.

Inspired by the success of Don Bluth's animated films as well as Disney's early-1990s animation renaissance, Rich decided to adapt the German folk tale version of Swan Lake. During production, the script went through twelve drafts over the course of two years. Rich would later attempt to sell his script to several Hollywood studios to no success. Later, Brown struck on the idea on merging Rich Animation Studios, Family Entertainment Network, and Cassette Duplicators Inc., a cassette-duplicating operation in West Valley City, Utah, into one production holding company called Nest Entertainment.

The film was created by hand painting cels, a tedious technique which caused Rich and his crew to take over four years to produce the final product. Most of the cel painting was done at Hanho Heung-Up in Seoul, South Korea. Overall, 275 animators and artists worked throughout the film's production.

Music 

David Zippel was approached by Richard Rich to write the lyrics to songs for The Swan Princess, while the songs and score were composed by Lex de Azevedo.

The theme song "Far Longer than Forever" was written by de Azevedo and Zippel. In the film, the song was performed by vocalists Liz Callaway (as the singing voice of Princess Odette) and Howard McGillin (as the speaking and singing voice of Prince Derek). In the closing credits, a pop/R&B rendition of the song was performed by recording artists Regina Belle and Jeffrey Osborne. In the 1997 sequel Escape from Castle Mountain, Michelle Nicastro sings a reprise of the song.

Caryn James of The New York Times noted the "melody of 'Far Longer Than Forever' ... echoes the first five notes of 'Beauty and the Beast'." Animation historian Jerry Beck wrote in his book The Animated Movie Guide that the song had a theme of faith. The pop single was jointly released by Sony Wonder and Sony 550 Music. MusicHound Soundtracks: The Essential Album Guide to Film, Television and Stage Music called the "seemingly mandatory big ballad" "extremely annoying" due to "strik[ing] a totally different artistic note" in the context of the film's musical landscape. The 1995 edition of The Motion Picture Guide felt the "love theme" was deserving of the Golden Globe. John Hartl of The Seattle Times deemed the song "insistent", noting that audiences may "quickly get their fill" of the tune.

"Far Longer than Forever" was nominated for a Golden Globe in 1995 for Best Original Song.

Release 
When The Swan Princess was nearing completion, New Line Cinema purchased the distribution rights in the United States, and Columbia TriStar Film Distributors International obtained the foreign distribution rights.

Marketing 
Pillsbury partnered with Turner Home Entertainment for a marketing campaign to promote the film's home video release.

Home media 
Turner Home Entertainment first released The Swan Princess on VHS and LaserDisc in the Turner Family Showcase collection on August 3, 1995 and sold over 2.5 million units. Outside the United States, Columbia TriStar Home Video released it on VHS. On March 30, 2004, Columbia TriStar Home Entertainment released the film for the first time on DVD. The Special Edition DVD contains a few extras, including trailers, a read-along feature, a sing-along feature, and games. Sony Pictures Home Entertainment later re-released the DVD on August 18, 2009. It was also released as a double-feature DVD with its sequel The Swan Princess 3: The Mystery of the Enchanted Kingdom. A Blu-ray version of the film was released on October 29, 2019, for its 25th anniversary.

Reception

Critical response 
The Swan Princess received favorable reviews. Roger Ebert of the Chicago Sun-Times gave the film three out of four stars, writing "Despite the comparatively limited resources at his disposal, Richard Rich shows that he understands the recent Disney animated renaissance and can create some of the same magic. The movie isn't in the same league as Disney's big four, and it doesn't have the same crossover appeal to adults, but as family entertainment, it's bright and cheerful, and it has its moments." Similarly, Hal Hinson of The Washington Post said it was a better film than The Lion King, praising its "fluid, unhurried pace" and "lush, original sense of color", though deeming the score "[not] terribly distinctive". Caryn James of The New York Times noted the film's similarities to Beauty and the Beast (1991), writing it was "not quite as good or fresh, but it's delicious all the same, bound to amuse children and entertain their trapped parents, too."

Brian Lowry of Variety stated the film was "technically impressive but rather flat and languid storywise". James Berardinelli of ReelViews gave the film  stars of 4, writing that "much of The Swan Princess is trite and uninspired", though added "nevertheless, despite its problems, The Swan Princess is actually one of the better non-Disney animated productions to come along in a while". Gene Siskel of The Chicago Tribune gave the film two out of four stars, writing the film is a "casually drawn tale of a boring prince and princess tormented by a dull sorcerer. The songs are weak, and no relationship is developed between the principals." On Rotten Tomatoes, The Swan Princess has an approval rating of 50% based on 12 reviews and an average score of 5.4/10.

Box office 
During its opening weekend, The Swan Princess opened in tenth place at the box office, earning $2.4 million. It eventually grossed $9.8 million against a $21 million budget, becoming a box office bomb, mostly due to struggling competition with several other family films and a re-release of The Lion King.

Disney's reissuing of The Lion King just as this film was being released was seen as "sabotage" by Variety.

See also 
 Swan Lake (1981 film)

References

External links 

 
 

 
1994 films
1994 animated films
1990s American animated films
1994 comedy-drama films
1990s fantasy adventure films
1990s fantasy comedy films
1990s musical comedy films
1990s musical films
1994 romantic comedy films
1990s romantic musical films
American children's animated adventure films
American children's animated comedy films
American children's animated drama films
American children's animated fantasy films
American children's animated musical films
American comedy-drama films
American fantasy comedy films
American fantasy adventure films
American romantic comedy films
American romantic fantasy films
American romantic musical films
American musical comedy films
American musical drama films
Animated romance films
Films about frogs
Films about turtles
Animated films about birds
Children's comedy-drama films
Fictional princesses
Films about royalty
Films about shapeshifting
Films based on fairy tales
Films directed by Richard Rich
Films scored by Lex de Azevedo
Films set in castles
Films with screenplays by Brian Nissen
Films with screenplays by Richard Rich
New Line Cinema animated films
New Line Cinema films
Films about witchcraft
Films set in the Middle Ages
Balls (dance party) in films
1990s children's animated films
1990s English-language films